CubePort is a commercial software application that converts from Oracle Essbase to the analogous Microsoft product Microsoft Analysis Services, which is built into Microsoft SQL Server.  This application achieves this through various analogy mapping techniques, and is a standard client-server application that runs on a Windows computer but may connect to non-Windows servers.  CubePort converts the various OLAP structures and syntaxes in the source through an extraction process, interprets, and recreates in the target.  The objective is to simulate exactly the behavior of the original source system to the target system.

The application also includes UI phases such as Authentication, Questions, Extraction, and Verification.  Substantial testing normally occurs after the conversion process prior to posting the objects to production.

History
The software was released widely in 2005.  CubePort represents the first product of its kind in the Business intelligence platform migration space.  The product was design and created to provide an organization with the ability to move their Business Intelligence assets from one platform to another.   
        
Unlike the RDBMS (relational databases) world where there exists the commonplace ability to migrate from one RDBMS product type to another, in the Business Intelligence or OLAP product space, this capability is currently not found in the marketplace.

Usage Motivations
Motivations for migrating from one Business Intelligence platform to another, regardless of whether this is achieved through automated or manual methods, vary from implementation to implementation, and may include one or more of the following motivations:
 Reduction of licensing or recurring maintenance expense
 Increase of detail-level of the cube 
 Increase of the user count
 Elimination of cube load and calculation time constraints 
 Elimination of pervasive vendor lock-in scenario
 Standardization towards Microsoft BI platform, where appropriate

Objects Converted

These standard objects in a cube are converted by the software with varying levels of robustness:
 Cube Outline
 Cube Data Loads and Dimension Builds
 Cube Security Model
 Cube Substitution Variables
 Cube Calculation Scripts
 Cube Report Scripts

The output objects of a successful run of CubePort are: A relational Star schema and/or relational Snowflake schema, OLAP cube, Etl load packages, MDX (Multidimensional Expressions) files, and others.

See also
 Comparison of OLAP servers
 Data transformation

External links
 SSAS Info Analysis Services Information Page
 Product Preview on CubePort
 Corporate Product Page
 Microsoft's Mosha Pasumansky's Analysis Services Product Page
 Microsoft Solution Page
 Mosha Pasumanky's BI Blog

Online analytical processing